Houdini is a two-part, four-hour History channel miniseries written by Nicholas Meyer and directed by Uli Edel. It premiered on September 1, 2014. The series stars Adrien Brody as Harry Houdini and features the life of the legendary illusionist and escape artist from poverty to worldwide fame.

Plot
The miniseries follows the man behind the magic as he finds fame, engages in espionage, battles spiritualists and encounters the greatest names of the era. The drama will chronicle the life of a man who can defy death through his stunts, his visions and his mastery of illusion.

Cast
 Adrien Brody as Harry Houdini, world-famous magician
 Kristen Connolly as Bess Houdini, Harry's wife
 Evan Jones as Jim Collins, Harry's assistant
 Eszter Ónodi as Cecilia Weiss, Harry's mother
 Tom Benedict Knight as Dash Houdini, Harry's younger brother 
 Louis Mertens as Erich Weiss (young Harry)
 Tim Pigott-Smith as William Melville - Head of MI5
 Shaun Williamson as Sidney Reilly, MI5 agent and Harry's handler
 David Calder as Sir Arthur Conan Doyle, creator of Sherlock Holmes and believer in spiritualism 
 Linda Marlowe as Lady Doyle, Arthur Conan Doyle's clairvoyant wife

Production

Development
History first announced the development of a Houdini biopic miniseries with Adrien Brody attached to star on April 10, 2013.  The series was officially green-lit on August 19, 2013, with Kristen Connolly announced as Brody's co-star and Uli Edel as director.  The screenplay was to be penned by veteran author and filmmaker Nicholas Meyer, based on the 1976 book Houdini: A Mind in Chains: A Psychoanalytic Portrait by his father, Bernard C. Meyer. Patrizia von Brandenstein and Karl Walter Lindenlaub were also announced as production designer and cinematographer, respectively.  On September 17, 2013, it was announced that actor Evan Jones had been added to the cast as Houdini's assistant Jim Collins.

Filming
Filming on the miniseries began on September 30, 2013. It was shot entirely in Budapest, Hungary (coincidentally the real Harry Houdini's birthplace), which executive producer Gerald W. Abrams described as having "more turn-of-the-century architecture—that's the 19th century—than almost any city in Western culture." Brody, who had studied magic as a child, performed many of the show's stunts himself, including the suspended strait jacket escape and the famous Chinese Water Torture Cell.

Music
The score to Houdini was written by the veteran film composer John Debney.  A lifelong fan of Harry Houdini, Debney joined the project at the behest of a producer with whom he had previously collaborated on the A&E miniseries Bonnie & Clyde.  Rather than compose a period score for the series, Debney instead elected to write an "electronic/contemporary" score, with "instruments from the period that would give you the flavor of the times and give you the feeling of who this guy was."  A two volume soundtrack was released for digital download by Lakeshore Records on August 26, 2014 and later on CD September 23, 2014.

Promotion
A trailer for Houdini was released online in early August 2014.

Episodes

Reception

Ratings
Part 1 of the series was watched by 3.7 million viewers, averaging 1.2 million among adults 18–49 and 1.5 million in 25–54. Despite debuting much lower than History's previous series' Hatfields & McCoys and Bonnie & Clyde, Houdini was nevertheless cable television's top miniseries debut of 2014 to date.

Critical response
Houdini received a mixed response, with praise for the direction, sound design, and Brody's performance as a "comeback", although the script was criticized. The series currently holds a 44% "Rotten" rating on the review aggregator Rotten Tomatoes, with a consensus "Houdini's cast is talented, but given the decades of fascination surrounding its subject, the show is oddly lacking in intrigue."

Allison Keene of The Hollywood Reporter praised Brody's Houdini as possessing "infectious zest" and commented that "... the miniseries nails the most important thing: spectacle. Edel's refreshingly dynamic direction and Brody’s buoyant performance allow Houdini's tricks to retain their wonder, even for the jaded modern viewer. That's a magical feat indeed." Despite referring to some aspects of the series as "a bit heavy-handed," Mark Perigard of the Boston Herald gave Houdini a positive "B" rating and opined, "You’ll almost believe in magic—the magic of a miniseries to capture the tics and tricks of a complicated, driven man."

Neil Genzlinger of The New York Times called Brody "a treat to watch," but criticized the screenplay and direction.  He added, "A better version of this amazing life will surely be made in one genre or another, but this one's at least diverting." Brian Lowry of Variety, however, spoke less favorably of the series, describing Brody's performance as being "ultimately overwhelmed" by Meyer's "misbegotten, heavy-handed, narrated-ad-nauseam script (...) and Uli Edel's equally obtrusive direction."

Meyer addressed the voiceovers in a subsequent interview with StarTrek.com, stating "Well, they – you know, sort of re-cut the movie, and tore a lot of it out, and put in a lot of voiceovers and stuff that I just wasn't crazy about. And [it] wasn't our intention. It hadn't been written."

Awards and nominations

International broadcast 
Houdini was first shown on Channel 4 in the UK in September 2014 and later released on Netflix UK on 7 March 2015. Houdini premiered on the Seven Network on June 23, 2015. It is available on Shomi in Canada. In Brazil Houdini aired on January 5, 2016 as a four-part series on Globo channel. It is available on Sony Liv in India.

References

External links
 

2014 American television series debuts
2010s American drama television miniseries
American biographical series
Films about magic and magicians
History (American TV channel) original programming
Films about Grigori Rasputin
Cultural depictions of Arthur Conan Doyle
Cultural depictions of Harry Houdini
MI5 in fiction
Television series set in the 1890s
Television series set in the 1900s
Television series set in the 1910s
Television series set in the 1920s
Television shows filmed in Hungary
Films with screenplays by Nicholas Meyer
2010s American television miniseries